Goran Rubil (born 9 March 1981) is a Croatian former professional footballer who played as a midfielder.

Career
Rubil started his career in his hometown club Marsonia Slavonski Brod. At the age of 17 he moved to France to play for FC Nantes, where he remained until the end of the 2004–05 season. During his time at Nantes he played only ten league matches for the club, but was a regular in the Croatian U19 and U21 sides. He spent the 2003–04 season on loan with Stade Lavallois where he had eight appearances and scored one goal.

In mid-2005 he signed for the J2 League team Shonan Bellmare. In early 2006 he moved back to Croatia to join HNK Rijeka, where he stayed until the mutual termination of his contract in December of the same year. Several clubs, both in Croatia and abroad showed interest. He went to England on trial for Leeds United, and looked set to sign for them, but apparently got tired of waiting, and returned to Croatia to sign a 3.5-year contract for Hajduk Split.

Career statistics

References

External links
 
 Goran Rubil profile at Nogometni Magazin 
 

1981 births
Living people
Sportspeople from Slavonski Brod
Association football midfielders
Croatian footballers
Croatia youth international footballers
Croatia under-21 international footballers
FC Nantes players
Stade Lavallois players
Shonan Bellmare players
HNK Rijeka players
HNK Hajduk Split players
Asteras Tripolis F.C. players
Ligue 1 players
Ligue 2 players
J2 League players
Croatian Football League players
Super League Greece players
Croatian expatriate footballers
Croatian expatriate sportspeople in France
Expatriate footballers in France
Croatian expatriate sportspeople in Japan
Expatriate footballers in Japan
Croatian expatriate sportspeople in Greece
Expatriate footballers in Greece